HMS Vixen was a Vickers three funnel - 30 knot destroyer ordered by the Royal Navy under the 1895 – 1896 Naval Estimates.  She was the fourth ship to carry this name since it was introduced in 1801 for an 18-gun brig sold 1815.

Construction and career
She was laid down on 7 September 1899 at Vickers, Sons and Maxim Naval Construction and Armaments shipyard at Barrow-in-Furness and launched on 29 March 1900.  During her builder's trials she made her contract speed of 30 knots.  She was completed and accepted by the Royal Navy in March 1902.

Vixen was assigned to the Channel Fleet. She was commissioned at Devonport by Commander William George Elmhirst Ruck-Keene on 11 March 1902, for service with the Devonport instructional flotilla. Commander Ruck-Keene and the crew transferred to HMS Gipsy on 30 July 1902, when the latter ship replaced her in the Flotilla. She spent her operational career mainly in Home Waters operating with the Channel Fleet in the East Coast Flotilla.

In the evening of 16 August 1912 she was in collision with the ferry South Shields while proceeding down river.

On 30 August 1912 the Admiralty directed all destroyer classes were to be designated by alpha characters starting with the letter 'A'.  Since her design speed was 30-knots and she had three funnels she was assigned to the C Class. After 30 September 1913, she was known as a C Class destroyer and had the letter ‘C’ painted on the hull below the bridge area and on either the fore or aft funnel.

World War I
In September 1914 the 7th was redeployed to the Humber River. Her employment within the Humber Patrol included anti-submarine and counter mining patrols.

In November 1916 she was redeployed to the Nore Local Flotilla performing anti-submarine patrols and counter mining operations off the Thames until the Armistice.

In 1919 she was paid off and laid-up in reserve awaiting disposal.   She was sold on 17 March 1921 to Thos. W. Ward for breaking at Grays, Essex, on the Thames Estuary.

Pennant Numbers

References
NOTE:  All tabular data under General Characteristics only from the listed Jane's Fighting Ships volume unless otherwise specified

Bibliography
 
 
 
 
 
 
 
 

 

Ships built in Barrow-in-Furness
1900 ships
C-class destroyers (1913)
World War I destroyers of the United Kingdom